Iñaki Antigüedad Auzmendi (born 1955, Bilbao) is a Basque geologist and politician. He is professor of hydrogeology at the University of the Basque Country, and leader of Amaiur.

Following the strong performance of Amaiur in the 2011 Spanish general election, Antigüedad is leading a campaign to hold a referendum on Basque independence.

See also
 2008 Basque referendum

References

External links
 Iñaki Antiguedad: “El 20 de noviembre, que ningún independentista se quede en casa sin ir a votar”, video of Antigüedad speech at pre-election rally at the Velódromo de Anoeta, at www.amaiur.info 

1955 births
Amaiur politicians
Herri Batasuna politicians
Leaders of political parties in Spain
Living people
Politicians from Bilbao
Spanish geologists
Academic staff of the University of the Basque Country
Members of the 10th Congress of Deputies (Spain)
Members of the 4th Basque Parliament
Members of the 6th Basque Parliament
University of the Basque Country alumni